Black Workers' Struggle for Equality in Birmingham is a 2001 book written by David Montgomery, Professor of History Emeritus at Yale University, in collaboration with Horace Huntley of the Birmingham Civil Rights Institute. The book makes use of oral histories to explain the interactions between African-American workers and labor unions in the post-Civil War American South.

2001 non-fiction books
American history books
Books about African-American history
Books about labor history
Oral history books
21st-century history books
History of African-American civil rights
Books by David Montgomery (historian)
African-American trade unions